Louis Édouard Paul Lieutard (Brignoles, 21 June  1842 — 23 October 1902) was a French Navy officer. He notably set a formal claim for France on the Kerguelen Islands in 1893. Mont Lieutard was named in his honour.

Biography 
Lieutard joined the Navy in 1859. He was promoted to Midshipman at Toulon in 1861, to Ensign in 1865, and to Lieutenant in 1865.

He served on the aviso Vaudreuil, the armoured frigate Gauloise, and the armoured frigate Provence.

In 1884, he was given command of the schooner Aorai at Tahiti, and was promoted to Commander the year after. After working ashore at Toulon for several years, he was given command of the gunboat Fusée in 1891.

In 1892, Lieutard was given command of Eure. From 1 to 15 January 1893, he conducted a mission to formally claim possession of the Kerguelen Islands for France. The crew of Eure set copper plaques and emergency food depots for castaways in various sports of the islands.

Lieutard went on to captain the paddle aviso Shamrock, and served as director or port moves in Toulon and Brest.

Works

Sources and references 
 Notes

References

 External links
 
 

French Navy officers
1842 births
1902 deaths